is the longest German Autobahn and the longest national motorway in Europe at 963 km (598 mi). It bisects the country almost evenly between east and west. In the north, it starts at the border with Denmark as an extension of the Danish part of E45. In the south, the autobahn ends at the Austrian border. This final gap was closed in September 2009.

Overview 

The Bundesautobahn 7 starts at Flensburg and travels through the two states at Schleswig and Rendsburg, through the world's busiest artificial waterway of Kiel Canal crossing the Rader high bridge. At Rendsburg you can change to the A 210, a feeder to the Schleswig-Holstein capital, Kiel. A few kilometers further south there is another feeder route to Kiel, the A 215, into the A7 at the interchange Bordesholm; however, this can only be reached from the south, likewise from the A 215 you can only reach the A7 in the south. South of Bordesholm, the highway has been continuously expanded to six lanes since 2014 due to the high traffic volume to Hamburg. Since 2016 and 2017, several sections have six lanes. Here, the motorway leads past the cities of Neumünster, Bad Bramstedt and Norderstedt, before the hamlet of Schnelsen reaches Hamburg's urban area, and also Hamburg Airport. From the intersection Hamburg-Nordwest, where the A23 branches off towards Heide, the A7 is six lanes, but is currently being expanded to eight lanes.

The section through the city of Hamburg is characterized by an immense volume of traffic, congestion is the order of the day here. There are several reasons for this: the motorway runs through inner-city areas, there is a lot of holiday traffic on the route during school holidays, there are practically no opportunities for bypassing, the speed is permanently limited to 80 km / h as an urban area and the section is extended, South of the equipped with four tubes to two lanes Elbe tunnel leads the A7 on the highway Elbmarsch, the longest road bridge in Germany, right through the harbor area and the Harburg mountains to Lower Saxony. Via the corner junction A 261 you get to the A 1 to Bremen, at the following Maschener Kreuz on the A 39 to Lüneburg.

Going through Hanover from Hamburg, the highway has six lanes, and it was downgraded to the four-lane section between Soltau and Walsrode the hard shoulder can be temporarily released as a third lane. It leads across the Lüneburg Heath, partly with separate directional lanes. At the triangle Walsrode you reach the A 27 to Bremen and a few kilometers to the south, before reaching the capital of Lower Saxony, at the junction Hannover-Nord on the A 352, which connects to Hannover Airport and ends at the A 2, which leads to Dortmund. The following motorway junctions of the A7 provide a connection to the A37 Hanover city center and to Celle or A 2 Ruhrgebiet-Berlin dar. By the Altwarmbüchener Moor the highway leads east to Hanover; at the triangle Hannover-Süd, where the southern branch of the A 37 to the fair Hanover is connected only with the further south part of the A7.

South of Hildesheim, the A7 enters a low mountain range and the terrain becomes hilly. The Salzgitter triangle also connects only the southern part of the A7 with the A 39 to Braunschweig and Salzgitter. Between the triangle Salzgitter and Göttingen the highway is expands to six lanes. Passing the university town, the A 38 branches off at Dreieck Drammetal to Leipzig, then the A7 leads over steep gradients and slopes down into the Werratal near the town of Hann. Münden and continues onto Hesse.

At Kassel, it is the largest district, from there you can get on the A44 in the direction of the west to the Ruhr area and in some years, when the extension Kassel-Herleshausen will be completed, also in the direction of Eisenach. Between the interchange Kassel-Ost and the interchange Kassel-Süd, the A7 is being developed eight-lane for a future convergence with the then branching off to the east A44. In Kassel, the unfinished A 49 branches off, which will lead from completed completion to the Ohmtal triangle, which is to be built near Homberg (Ohm) between the junctions Alsfeld-West and Homberg (Ohm) on the A5. Between Kassel and Kirchheim the Knüllgebirge is crossed. The Kirchheim triangle and the Hattenbacher triangle, which are close to each other and quite close to the geographic center of Germany, together form one of the most important motorway junctions of the state. The A 4 leads to the New Länder and Eastern Europe, the A 5 to the Rhine-Main area and on to the border of Switzerland. South of the Hattenbacher triangle is the A7 sections four-lane expanded, leads past Fulda, where the A 66 branches off to Hanau and reaches Bavarian territory.

Crossing the Rhön Mountains, pass Schweinfurt (cross with the A 70 to Bayreuth) and Würzburg to the Biebelried intersection, where the A 3 Ruhrgebiet-Frankfurt am Main-Nürnberg-Passau is crossed. This was the southern end of the A7 for a long time. The completion of the south in the 1980s leads past Rothenburg ob der Tauber on the western edge of the Frankenhöhe to the freeway junction Feuchtwangen / Crailsheim (intersection with the A 6 Saarbrücken-Heilbronn-Nuremberg- Waidhaus) and partly Baden-Württemberg area over the Ostalb, for the crossing even two tunnels had to be built, via Aalen to Ulm. At the motorway junction Ulm / Elchingen, the A8 (Luxembourg-Karlsruhe-Stuttgart-Munich-Salzburg) is crossed. South of Ulm it goes through the Illertal parallel to the river back to Bavaria, via Memmingen (cross with the A 96 Lindau Munich) and Kempten (branch to the A 980 to Oberstdorf), over the 2009 completed section through the Reinertshoftunnel to the edge of the foot of the Alps. There, the lane becomes one lane and flows into the border tunnel Füssen to Austria.

History 

The highway replaced as a trunk connection the imperial or federal roads 76, 77, 205 and 4 (Flensburg-Hamburg), 3 (Hamburg-Kassel) and 27 (Göttingen-Würzburg), which in turn went back to medieval precursors. On the route between Flensburg and Hamburg, for example, it follows the historic Ochsenweg and can be described as its successor in terms of its importance as a trade route from Scandinavia to the south. Plans for a highway from Hamburg to the south were made in the framework of the HaFraBa from 1926. This project is considered to be the predecessor of the A7 between Hamburg and the Hattenbacher Dreieck.

The first section opened from Göttingen to Bad Hersfeld in 1937. Construction of the section between Bad Hersfeld and Würzburg (Strecke 46) began in 1937 with various bridge structures built however the road wasn't completed before war broke out in 1939 and construction was stopped before being fully abandon in 1940. After World War 2 the route of A7 was altered leaving some of the abandoned bridge structures of Strecke 46 to be preserved as historic monuments.

From the 1950s, the highway was built between the A 1 south of Hamburg and the existing part of the A7 near Göttingen and opened in sections. At the A1 the "Horster triangle" was created as the new beginning of the A7. From the south (Hanover) coming vehicles had there at the threading to the A1 in the direction of west (Bremen) drive through a steep curve for many years.

The section Echte-Seesen was opened on 14 November 1959. The section Seesen Hildesheim was opened on 15 December 1960 by Secretary of Transportation Seebohm.

From 1956, the seven sections between Hamburg and Hanover were handed over to traffic. In 1960, the 21 km section between junction Berkhof and the cross Hannover / Kirchhorst was opened last.

The four remaining sections in between were opened in 1958. The gap closure was achieved with the 35 km section between motorway junction Hannover / Kirchhorst and junction Hildesheim in 1962.

In the 1960s, the A7 was then built on a slightly different route. The first to be opened in 1965 was the 10.9 km section north of the Biebelried interchange to the junction Würzburg / Estenfeld. 1966 followed the adjacent section to the present cross Schweinfurt / Werneck and the 14.8 km long section between Fulda North and Fulda South. The northernmost section from the Hattenbacher Triangle to Fulda (32 km) and the middle section between Fulda and Schweinfurt (68 km) were finally handed over to traffic in 1968.

In the 1960s and 1970s, the highway was built in the Hamburg area and the so-called north axis to Denmark and handed over to traffic. The construction took place in nine sections. An important milestone was the opening of the New Elbe Tunnel in 1975. On 13 July 1976, Ernst Haar, Parliamentary State Secretary of the Federal Ministry of Transport, and Schleswig-Holstein's Minister of the Interior Rudolf Titzck solemnly opened the motorway section from Tarp to Handewitt. Only in 1978, the last vacant space between Tarp and Schuby was closed, so that the highway could be driven from Hamburg to the federal border.

On 13 June 1978, Queen Margrethe II and President Walter Scheel opened the border crossing Ellund, accompanied by Prime Minister Gerhard Stoltenberg and the Flensburg Mayor Ingrid Gross. At 10.55 clock they officially released the freeway and passport control, at 12.32 clock rolled the first car through the new border crossing. Ellund developed into the most important transit point of German-Danish border traffic. In 1979, 3.2 million travelers passed the counters; until 1997, the number had more than quintupled at 16.7 million.

In the preliminary draft for a motor vehicle road network of Germany of the study company for automotive road construction (STUFA) of 1926 a highway Würzburg-Ulm-Lindau was provided, detail planning took place from 1935 to 1941. In 1969, the states of Bavaria and Baden-Württemberg were able to agree on a line parallel to the federal highway 19.

From 1972 first sections could be released. It started with the Berkheim section to junction Memmingen-Süd (9.4 km) and the first 27.1 km long directional lane between Bad Grönenbach and Kempten-Leubas.

Major sections were between Kreuz Biebelried and junction Uffenheim-Langensteinach (34.7 km) in 1980, the southern extension to the junction Feuchtwangen (42.1 km) in 1985 and further to the junction Heidenheim (59.6 km) opened in 1987. Since the last 6.8 kilometers to the junction Oy-Mittelberg were already released a year ago, the highway was already passable from Denmark to the Allgäu.

In 1992, the A7 was extended by another 4.9 km to Nesselwang. A few meters west of the junction of the same name is the highest motorway point in Germany: "914.081 m above sea level. NN ".

In July 1999, the opening of the border tunnel Füssen to Tyrol followed with a tube and two lanes. The tunnel is supposed to relieve the surrounding communities of the high traffic volume during vacation time. In 2005, the northern adjoining first directional lane was opened up to the county road at Gunzenberg. Until September 2009, traffic from the end of the motorway at Nesselwang was routed via various routes for cars and trucks to the border tunnel, which often led to traffic jams.

On 1 September 2009 was the official inauguration of the last 15-kilometer section, which was released more than a year late. The viaduct Enzenstetten was initially only one-way passable, as the construction-performing consortium could not complete it on time. The second half of the bridge went into operation in December 2010, to the Austrian border.

Recent changes 
The highway is from the Danish border to the Bordesholmer triangle with the A 215 four-lane expanded. To triangle Hamburg northwest with the A 23 are several sections since 2016/2017 six-lane, the remaining four-lobed sections are expected to end of 2019 six lanes expanded. It follows a six-lane section to the junction Hamburg-Bahrenfeld. Thereafter, eight lanes will be available in the Elbtunnels area. In the further course there are again six lanes, between the triangle Hamburg-southwest (A 261) and the Horster triangle (A 1) only four.

Between Hamburg and Hildesheim, the motorway has six lanes, with the exception of the four-lane section between the Soltau-Ost junction and the Walsrode junction (A 27). In this four-lane section can be released with a traffic control system as needed both hard shoulder as each third lane.

In this area, the highway was in early 2009 despite the heavy traffic largely from only four lanes. Only in a few gradient areas there was an additional third lane available. By the end of 2016, several sections were expanded. About half of the road is widened to six lanes.

Between Nörten-Hardenberg and the Hattenbacher Dreieck, the highway is consistently expanded to six-lane. South of Kassel, as well as between the Kirchheim triangle and the Hattenbacher triangle, there is an additional fourth lane on inclines in the direction of south. Because of the steep climbs and gradients, the section is known as the Kassel mountains and is considered by motorists to be particularly demanding for trucks and caravans.

Throughout the southern section, the A7 is four lanes. Only a few sections have more than two strips per directional lane. The highway ends since 1 September 2009 at the border tunnel Füssen. This contains only one tube with one lane per direction. In the area of the valley bridge Enzenstetten the A7 was only two-lane drivable until the completion of the second bridge in December 2010.

Under construction 
The A7 is being upgraded from the Bordesholm motorway intersection to the Hamburg Northwest motorway junction on 65 kilometers from four to six lanes. This measure will be realized through a public-private partnership and should cost a total of 600 million euros. The official starting signal for the major project in Schleswig-Holstein was on 1 September 2014. Already in May, preparations were started, especially in Hamburg. The expansion should take place until 2018. On 16 December 2016, Prime Minister Albig released the first section of the 6-lane A7 between the Bordesholm motorway junction and the AS Neumünster-Nord interchange. It has been agreed that the operating company will carry out the remaining work on the six-kilometer stretch between Neumünster and Bordesholm and then transfer it to the state of Schleswig-Holstein. The other 59 kilometers operates and receives the company until 2044. Since March, a 9.9-kilometer section at Großenaspe is six-lane expanded. On 7 April 2017, another expanded section was released by Prime Minister Albig. It is about 10 kilometers between the junctions Kaltenkirchen and Quickborn. At the end of the decade the realization of the project can be expected.

As part of the widening works, the A7 north of the Elbtunnel three covers of the highway are provided in Schnelsen, Stellingen, Othmarschen and Bahrenfeld. The allotments that have existed in the area for 90 years are to be "relocated" to these and thus ensure that the districts separated by the motorway grow together again. In addition to 25 hectares of green space and 3000 apartments to be created. The plan approval decision for the six-lane expansion between the triangle Hamburg-Nordwest and Schnelsen was made on 15 December 2012. After the end of the current construction measures, the lids should have a total length of 3.8 kilometers. In addition to 240 million euros from the federal government, 160 to 240 million euros will go to the city of Hamburg for noise control measures.

In the further demand with planning right the six-lane development of the A7 over the connection point Soltau-Ost was planned up to the triangle Walsrode. On 30 March 2012, the federal government began planning for the six-lane expansion. The expansion is divided into three sections: triangle Walsrode to Bad Fallingbostel, Bad Fallingbostel to Dorfmark and Dorfmark to Soltau-Ost. For the section triangle Walsrode to Bad Fallingbostel, the plan approval decision was issued on 4 August 2015. Since the end of October there is building law for this section. 58 million euros were released in December 2015. Construction work began in early 2016 and construction began in August 2016. Construction of this section is expected to be ready in 2019. For the other two sections the design planning is running.

The six-lane widening of the sections from Soltau-Ost to Fallingbostel has been classified as an urgent need since 2016. The further eight-lane expansion to the triangle Hannover-Nord is only in the further need. On 29 January 2016, the planning approval procedure was initiated to expand the tank and rest area Allertal and to build the Allertal junction. The short four-lane section to the north of the Salzgitter triangle with the A 39 was upgraded to a priority requirement in 2016 with the amendment of the Fernstraßenausbaugesetz - bottleneck elimination. The continuation to Göttingen is unannounced plan-established, with the exception of the sections between Seesen and Nörten-Hardenberg already finished six-lane expansion and is in the status of ongoing and firmly scheduled in the highway development law.

From June 2012 to June 2013, a public-private partnership (PPP) was examined for the extension of the line between Seesen and Nörten-Hardenberg. According to this audit report of the Federal Court of Auditors, the expansion would not be cheaper in a PPP, but by 12.8 million euros more expensive. The project was awarded with the contract beginning 1 May 2017 to the consortium Via Niedersachsen with the shareholders VINCI Concessions Deutschland GmbH and Meridiam Investments. On 26 August 2015, the planning approval procedure was initiated for the conversion and expansion of the tank and service facility Göttingen with the construction of the Rosdorf exit.

The section between the future triangle Kassel-Ost and the triangle Kassel-Süd is under construction into eight lanes, since the total traffic of the A7 and the A44 shares this route. Construction began in fall 2011 and is expected to be completed in 2022. First, the noise protection is expanded. The additional lanes are created by making lanes and median strips narrower. In the course of the expansion, the refueling and rest area Kassel (-West and -Ost) was dismantled and rebuilt at the location of the Rastanlage Kassel-Ost between 2016 and 2018.

In planning stages
The A20 is to be connected at the level Bad Bramstedt via a motorway junction to the A7. At the south of the Hamburg Elbe Tunnel, the highway to the planned motorway junction Hamburg-Süderelbe with the federal highway 26 is eight stripe to be expanded. This should be implemented by 2022.

Current plans of the Federal Ministry of Transport provide an intersection of the A26 at the future motorway intersection Hamburg-Süderelbe south of the Elbe, where it will continue east through Wilhelmsburg as a so-called port passage to A1 with a motorway junction Hamburg-Stillhorn. In May 2011, funding was approved by the Federal Ministry of Transport.

To the east of Würzburg, between Kreuz Schweinfurt / Werneck and Kreuz Biebelried an expansion to six strips in the further need with planning right classified. On 15 June 2016, during the construction of the Schraudenbach valley bridge near Schraudenbach, the shoring collapsed during the concreting of a superstructure section. The accident cost the life of a construction worker. In addition, there were 14 life-threatening injuries.

The six-lane widening of the A7 in the section between the AD Hittistetten and the AS Illertissen was included in the Federal Transport Infrastructure Plan 2030 and the Highway Act as urgent needs, the further expansion to the junction Memmingen-South is added as a further need with planning law.

Strecke 46 
Through the Rhön Mountains and Spessart, where the autobahn was known as Strecke 46 (Route 46), some bridges were built as early as 1937, but construction was halted in October 1939 by World War II. In 1954, the Strecke 46 route was abandoned and the final stretch of the A 7 in this area was later built on a slightly different route and finally completed in 1968. The remains of Strecke 46 have been classified as a listed building in 2003 by the government of Bavaria.

References

Bibliography

External links 

Web site about the abandoned Strecke 46 plans (German language)
BAB Exits (German language)

7
A007
A007
A007
A007
A007
A007